Plants vs. Zombies 2 (originally known as Plants vs. Zombies 2: It's About Time) is a 2013 free tower defense video game developed by PopCap Games and published by Electronic Arts. It is the sequel to Plants vs. Zombies, and was released worldwide on Apple App Store on August 15, 2013, and Google Play on October 23, 2013. The player defends the lawn from zombies by placing a variety of plants. The player must battle the zombies in different time periods, including Ancient Egypt, the Golden Age of Piracy, the Wild West, the Last Ice Age, Mesoamerica, the future, the Middle Ages, the 1980s, the Jurassic Period, 1960s and the present.

Plot
The protagonist of the game uses a time machine named Penny to travel to different pseudo-historical settings with their neighbor, Crazy Dave, to find Dave's taco. The protagonist is engaged in a race through time with Dr. Zomboss, the main antagonist of the previous game, who is trying to prevent a paradox.

Gameplay
Plants vs. Zombies 2 is a free game, unlike its predecessor, supporting in-app free coins to use certain power-up abilities: Plant Food, a new power-up, allows plants to power up for varying amounts of time. Each plant has its own ability when given Plant Food. Players can complete the whole game without purchasing these abilities, some of which can be earned throughout the game instead of being purchased. Additionally, users can level up their plants using Seed Packets (found in-game real money) to allow them to permanently enhance their abilities. Players can start an optional tutorial in front of the player's house. Afterward, the player travels to Ancient Egypt and can win in-game World Keys by completing Day 25 to unlock new worlds (this required a certain number of stars in earlier updates). Worlds include Pirate Seas, Lost City, Jurassic Marsh, etc. The Chinese version has five additional worlds, which are Kongfu World, Sky City, Steam Age, Heian Age, and Renaissance Age. As players go through levels, they unlock new plants each with advantages and unique boosts.

Development
In August 2012, PopCap announced that they were working on a sequel to their previous game, Plants vs. Zombies, and that it would include "new features, settings, and situations". In a later announcement, the company confirmed that the new game would be released on July 18, 2013. On June 26, 2013, PopCap announced on their Twitter page that the game would release later than previously announced. On July 9, the game was released in Australia and New Zealand on the iOS App Store and came out worldwide on August 15, 2013. The Android version was released worldwide on October 23, 2013.

Release
The game was first expected to launch on iOS on July 18, 2013. On June 26, it was announced that the game was delayed until later in the summer on the game's official Twitter account. The game soft-launched in Australian and New Zealand App Stores on July 9 to test server capacity. It launched worldwide on iOS on August 15 and, in five days, topped the free app charts in 137 countries. On September 12, PopCap Games soft-launched the game for Android in China in Baidu AppSearch and announced that it would be coming to Google Play worldwide later in the year. On October 2, the game soft-launched on the Australian and New Zealand Google Play stores.

Reception

The game received mostly positive feedback from users and critics, despite using in-app purchases. Critics mostly praised the gameplay and graphics. It has a Metacritic score of 86/100 based on 36 reviews. PopCap Games announced at Gamescom on August 20, 2013, that the game had been downloaded 15 million times, making it the most successful EA mobile game launch. Ten days later, it was announced that the game had been downloaded 25 million times, exceeding the lifetime downloads of the first game. Apple chose Plants vs. Zombies 2 as a runner-up for 2013 iPhone game of the year.

References

External links
 

2013 video games
Android (operating system) games
Free-to-play video games
IOS games
Electronic Arts games
2
PopCap games
Single-player video games
Video games about time travel
Video games set in prehistory
Video games set in Egypt
Video games set in the 17th century
Video games about pirates
Video games set in the 19th century
Western (genre) video games
Video games set in the 1960s
Video games set in England
Video games set in the Middle Ages
Video games set in the 20th century
Video games set in the 1980s
Video games set in the 24th century
Tower defense video games
Video game sequels
Video games about plants
Video games scored by Peter McConnell
Video games about zombies
Spike Video Game Award winners
Video games developed in the United States